Trichydra is a monotypic genus of cnidarians belonging to the monotypic family Trichydridae. The only species is Trichydra pudica.

The species is found in Europe and Northern America.

References

Filifera
Hydrozoan genera
Monotypic cnidarian genera